This is a list of aviation accidents and incidents in Guatemala.

References 

 
Aviation accidents
Guatemala